The Tai Po District Council is the district council for the Tai Po District in Hong Kong. It is one of 18 such councils. The Tai Po District Council currently consists of 21 members, of which the district is divided into 19 constituencies, electing a total of 19 with 2 ex officio members who are the Tai Po and Sai Kung North rural committee chairmen. The latest election was held on 24 November 2019.

History

The Tai Po District Council was established on 1 April 1981 under the name of the Tai Po District Board as the result of the colonial Governor Murray MacLehose's District Administration Scheme reform. The District Board was partly elected with the ex-officio Regional Council members and chairmen of two Rural Committees, Tai Po and Sai Kung North, as well as members appointed by the Governor until 1994 when last Governor Chris Patten refrained from appointing any member.

The Tai Po District Board became Tai Po Provisional District Board after the Hong Kong Special Administrative Region (HKSAR) was established in 1997 with the appointment system being reintroduced by Chief Executive Tung Chee-hwa. The current Tai Po District Council was established on 1 January 2000 after the first District Council election in 1999. The appointed seats were abolished in 2015 after the modified constitutional reform proposal was passed by the Legislative Council in 2010.

The Tai Po District Board was a stronghold of the conservative Liberal Democratic Federation of Hong Kong (LDF) and its successor Hong Kong Progressive Alliance (HKPA) in the 1990s and early 2000s. The pro-business Liberal Party also established its presence in the district in the 1990s surrounding its chairman Allen Lee who was elected through the district in the 1995.

The pro-Beijing Democratic Alliance for the Betterment and Progress of Hong Kong (DAB) and the pro-democracy Democratic Party became the two dominant forces in the district after the handover. For the DAB, its vice-chairman Cheung Hok-ming who is also the chairman of the Tai Po Rural Committee has been the chairman of the council from 1994 to 2003 and again from 2008. For the Democratic Party, it was the base of the reformist "Young Turks" faction in the party represented by Legislative Councillor Andrew Cheng, until they broke away from the Democrats over the disagreement on the constitutional reform proposal in 2010 and formed the Neo Democrats.

In the 2019 election, the pro-democrats formed a coalition called Tai Po Democratic Alliance (TPDA) running in 17 constituencies against the pro-Beijing candidates. The pro-democrats achieved a historic landslide victory by sweeping all the elected seats in the council amid the massive pro-democracy protests. The pro-Beijing camp was completely wiped out except for the two ex-officio members who were also the Rural Committee chairmen.

Political control
Since 1982 political control of the council has been held by the following parties:

Political makeup

Elections are held every four years.

District result maps

Members represented
Starting from 1 January 2020:

Leadership

Chairs
Since 1985, the chairman is elected by all the members of the board:

Vice Chairs

Notes

References

 
Districts of Hong Kong
Tai Po District